The Flesh is a 1991 Italian drama film directed by Marco Ferreri. It was entered into the 1991 Cannes Film Festival.

Plot summary

Cast
 Sergio Castellitto - Paolo
 Francesca Dellera - Francesca
 Philippe Léotard
 Farid Chopel
 Petra Reinhardt
 Gudrun Gundelach
 Nicoletta Boris
 Clelia Piscitelli
 Elena Wiedermann
 Sonia Topazio
 Fulvio Falzarano
 Pino Tosca
 Eleonora Cecere
 Matteo Ripaldi
 Daniele Fralassi
 Salvatore Esposito

References

External links
 
 
 
 The Flesh at Variety Distribution

1991 films
1990s Italian-language films
1991 drama films
Films directed by Marco Ferreri
Italian drama films
1990s Italian films